A404 may refer to:

 A404 motorway (France)
 A404 road (England)
 RFA Bacchus (A404), a ship